Acoyte may refer to:
 Acoyte (Salta), a village in Salta province, Argentina
 Acoyte (Buenos Aires Metro), a station in Buenos Aires, Argentina